Eric M. Fowler is an American guitarist, singer, songwriter, composer and producer who is best known as a member of popular musical group Boxing Gandhis.  Fowler is a featured musician on many popular recordings by artists such as Sting, UB40, Rosanne Cash, Taylor Dayne, General Public, Clint Black, Kelly Price and the Boxing Gandhis. He currently resides in Los Angeles California with his wife Colette and 3 children.

Early life

Fowler was born in Pittsfield, Massachusetts.  his mother Francis is first cousins with Alice Brock (Alice's Restaurant) https://en.wikipedia.org/wiki/Alice_Brock and his maternal grandmothers first cousin was Sen. Margaret Chase Smith of Maine who famously denounced Sen. McCarthy during 1950 a brave "Declaration of Conscience" speech on the Senate floor. https://en.wikipedia.org/wiki/Margaret_Chase_Smith The family moved to Carpinteria, California and returned to Lenox, Massachusetts a year and half later.  Fowler performed in local bands throughout the mid-1980s and relocated to 1960s Counterculture Icon Wavy Gravy's Hog Farm in Laytonville, California in 1987. He later migrated to Los Angeles, CA where he attended the Musicians Institute in Hollywood, CA and shortly after became a studio assistant to John Barnes Sr., Fowler later joined the reconstituted British reggae ska group General Public appearing on the live recording of the international hit song "Save it for later" which became the B side to the hit single remake of "I'll take you there" and was featured in the film "Threesome" that same year.  During this time Fowler teamed up with well-known producer Andrew Growcott aka "Stoker" (drummer for Dexis Midnight Runners) and through this relationship was a featured guitarist on several hit songs with artists such as Sting, UB40, Rosanne Cash, Taylor Dayne, General Public, Clint Black, Kelly Price. Fowler left General Public to join Boxing Gandhis in support of their top 10 AAA hit self-titled debut album released on Mesa Blue Moon / Atlantic and which featured the hit single "If you Love Me Why am I dying".  The video for this song won Billboard Magazine award for Best Jazz Music Video which was odd since the band was an acoustic soul band reminiscent of Sly and the Family Stone, Little Feat and War.  Boxing Gandhis were the opening act for The Dave Matthews Band during the "Under the Table and Dreaming" album tour. After the tour the band was signed to Atlantic Records and secured a publishing deal with EMI Music Publishing in advance of the release of their 2nd Album Howard which was released on Atlantic Records.  The band embarked on a 2nd tour as opening act for The Dave Matthews Band in support of this 2nd album and released a 3rd record several years later.  The band is still actively recording and touring. Fowler continues to compose and produce music for film and television as well as for new artists.  Fowler and Boxing Gandhis bandmate Ernie Perez started a production company with Dave Matthews Band saxophonist Leroi Moore.  The three collaborated on recordings at the famed Dave Matthews Band recording studio "Haunted Hollow" culminating in the release of new albums by several artists including (Samantha Farrell, Melodrome & Art Decade). In 2014 Boxing Gandhis performed at WitZend in Venice, CA and announced that the group was planning to reform and release a new album with original members Dave Darling, Brie Darling, Ernie Perez, Alfredo Ballesteros, Ted Zig Zag Andreadis.

Currently Eric and wife Colette run a non profit www.huethemuse.org facilitating K-12 music, sound energy healing and mindfulness enrichment programs aimed at raising awareness for planet issues, combatting youth Eco anxiety and promoting collective consciousness concepts around global change initiatives.

Fowler continues to perform, compose and produce music for projects most recently contributing guitar for a Roger Daltry benefit project featuring The Specials.  Collaborated with Steve Ferrone (Tom Petty; Duran Duran, Chaka Kahn) on new original music for the debut Hue the Muse commercial music release.

Discography 

Sting – This Cowboy Song – Greatest Hits and Single – (Stoker Remix) - (A&M) Guitarist - RIAA Gold Certified
UB40 - Baby Come Back - Virgin- Guitar - RIAA Platinum Certified
George Clinton – Cosmic Slop - Guitar
Pato Banton – Baby Come Back - Virgin - Guitar - RIAA Platinum Certified
General Public – Save it for later (Live Recording) B Side Single to – (Sony) – I’ll Take You There - Guitar, vocals
Taylor Dayne – Wind Cries Mary - Searching for Jimi Hendrix Tribute (Capitol Records) - Guitar
Clint Black – A Bad Goodbye – RCA – Larry Sanders Show (Garry Shandling) - Guitar
Rosanne Cash – Manic Depression – Searching for Jimi Hendrix Tribute (Capitol Records) - Guitar
Kelly Price – While you were gone - Epic / Sony Music Soundtrack - Guitar
MFBird – Cooler – (Positone) - Guitar
Leah Andreone – Alchemy – (RCA) - Vocals
Pau Hana – Pau Hana - guitars
Boxing Gandhis – Howard - Atlantic Records – Guitar, Vocalist, Songwriter
Boxing Gandhis – Mesa Blue Moon – Guitar, Vocalist, Songwriter
Boxing Gandhis – 3rd 2nd Chance – Guitar, Vocalist, Songwriter
Horace Godwink – Thrift Shop - Producer, Songwriter, Guitar, Keyboards, Bass, Vocals
Horace Godwink – Afterglow - Producer, Songwriter, Guitar, Keyboards, Bass, Vocals

Television/Video/Web Credits

NBC – Providence – Producer, Guitar, Vocalist, Songwriter
ABC – Brothers & Sisters - Producer, Guitar, Vocalist, Songwriter
Fox Sports - Super Bowl Pregame Show - Musician
HBO - Garry Shandling Show - Guitarist
HBO – Cosmic Slop – Guitarist
Boxing Gandhis music video - Mesa Blue Moon - If you love me why am I dying
Jerry Lewis Telethon – Guest artist with Rebecca Carlish
PajamasTV - Consultant

Film Credits 
Anchorman 2 - Paramount Pictures - Vocals, Bass Guitar
Blue Streak - Columbia Pictures - Guitar
Conflict of Interest - HBO Films - Production Asst.
Brady Bunch the Movie -
Threesome – TriStar - Guitarist

Producer Credits

Art Decade
Channel
Roerer Music
Horace Godwink
Boxing Gandhis
Samantha Farrell

Commercial Credits

Burger King – Manthem – Vocalist – (90 Sec) – Crispin Porter
Burger King – Anniversary Gift - Shroom n Swiss – Vocalist - (60 Sec) - Crispin Porter
Burger King – Crashed Car – Shroom n Swiss – Vocalist - (30 Sec) - Crispin Porter
Burger King – New Tattoo – Shroom n Swiss  - Vocalist - (30 Sec) - Crispin Porter
Burger King – Smore’s – Vocalist – Crispin Porter
McDonald's – Value Meal – Producer/Guitarist
FedEx – Bus out to the country – Guitarist - BBDO
Zocor
Helio - Googlemaps
Toyota
Bud Light – Rock Paper Scissors

Live / Touring 

General Public – World Tour
Carole King
Dave Matthews Band
Boxing Gandhis - World Tour
Horace Godwink – World Tour
Hootie and the Blowfish
Big Head Todd and the Monsters
CC Deville
Richie Kotzen
Carrie Hamilton
Hot Tuna
Bectones
MFBird
The Gathering
Fade2Black
Stevie B.
The Fabulous Grunts of Pleasure
Street Legal
Fishbone
Untouchables
Jimmy Buffett
Alex Ligertwood
Steve Ferrone

References
 
 http://www.berkshirecounty.com/rogovoy/popcorner/pop10-4.html
 https://web.archive.org/web/20150923183924/http://www.berkshireweb.com/rogovoy/thebeat/beat000908.html
 http://www.rogovoy.com/archive/444.shtml
 https://itunes.apple.com/us/album/luminous/id332818389
 http://www.myspace.com/horacegodwink
 http://www.bijougroove.com
 http://www.myspace.com/boxinggandhis

Living people
1968 births